Uncommon Schools (Uncommon) is a non-profit charter public school managed and operated in the United States that starts and manages urban schools for low-income students. Uncommon Schools starts and manages 53 urban charter public schools. Uncommon Schools are in five regions: Boston MA, Camden NJ, Newark NJ, New York City, and Rochester NY.

History
The organization first supported the creation of North Star Academy Charter School of Newark, which opened in 1997. North Star was co-founded by Norman Atkins and Jamey Verrilli. In 2005, Uncommon formalized its mission as a charter management organization with the goal of starting and managing schools that create  college prep opportunities for low-income children. In 2009, the founders of Uncommon, along with those of Achievement First and KIPP created Teacher U at Hunter College. This program was expanded into the Relay Graduate School of Education, an independent graduate school for teachers in these charter management networks to earn degrees.

Schools
Uncommon manages school networks in five regions:

Boston, MA 
 Roxbury Prep Mission Hill Campus
 Roxbury Prep Lucy Stone Campus
 Roxbury Prep Dorchester Campus
 Roxbury Prep High School

Camden, NJ
 Camden Prep Mt. Ephraim Elementary / Middle School
 Camden Prep Copewood Elementary / Middle School
 Camden Prep High School

New York City, NY
 Bedford Stuyvesant Collegiate
 Brownsville Collegiate 
 Excellence Boys Elementary / Middle Academy
 Excellence Girls Elementary / Middle Academy
 Kings Collegiate
 Kings Elementary School
 Leadership Prep Bedford Stuyvesant Elementary Academy / Middle Academy
 Leadership Prep Brownsville Elementary Academy / Middle Academy 
 Leadership Prep Canarsie Elementary Academy / Middle Academy 
 Leadership Prep Ocean Hill Elementary Academy / Middle Academy 
 Ocean Hill Elementary School 
 Ocean Hill Collegiate Charter School
 Uncommon Charter High School
 Uncommon Collegiate Charter High School
 Uncommon Leadership Charter High School
 Uncommon Preparatory Charter High School
 Williamsburg Collegiate Charter School

Newark, NJ  
 North Star Academy Fairmount Elementary School
 North Star Academy Vailsburg Elementary School
 North Star Academy West Side Park Elementary School
 North Star Academy West Side Park Middle School
 North Star Academy Liberty Elementary School
 North Star Academy Clinton Hill Middle School
 North Star Academy Downtown Middle School
 North Star Academy Vailsburg Middle School
 North Star Academy West Side Park Middle School
 North Star Academy Washington Park High School
 North Star Academy Lincoln Park Elementary School
 North Star Academy Lincoln Park Middle School
 North Star Academy Lincoln Park High School
 North Star Academy Alexander Elementary School

Rochester, NY   
 Rochester Prep Elementary School - Jay Street
 Rochester Prep Elementary School - West Campus
 Rochester Prep Elementary School - 3 
 Rochester Prep Middle School – Brooks Campus
 Rochester Prep Middle School – West Campus
 Rochester Prep Middle School 3
 Rochester Prep High School

Results

In New York City, Uncommon Schools have performed well on recent standardized tests. Kings Collegiate Middle School received a B rating on their 2011-2012 NYC DOE Progress Report, and Brownsville Collegiate Charter received an A overall rating. At Williamsburg Collegiate, 100% of fifth graders passed the 2009 state Math exam.

On September 9, 2010, U.S. Secretary of Education Arne Duncan recognized Uncommon Schools’ North Star Academy as a 2010 National Blue Ribbon School. The highest award bestowed by the department, it honors 304 public and private elementary, middle, and high schools that demonstrate the highest student achievement in their respective states and/or have closed the achievement gap.

At Troy Prep, 100% of seventh graders passed the 2011-2012 state exam, and 38% of fifth graders passed the ELA exam, which was slightly better than the district average. Seventh grade ELA scores were significantly better at 56% passing (compared to 37% in the district).

Awards
Uncommon Schools won the 2013 Broad Prize for Public Charter Schools and received $250,000 to support college-readiness efforts for their students.

References

External links
 http://www.uncommonschools.org

Charter schools in the United States